Asker is a municipality of Akershus County in Norway.

Asker  may also refer to:

Asker Hundred, a Hundred of Södermanland in Sweden
Asker River,  West Dorset, England.
Niklas Asker (born 1979), Swedish comic book artist
Asker, American indie-rock band.

See also
 Askar (disambiguation)